Harmon (formerly Harman and Wildcat) is an unincorporated community in Harmon Township, Washington County, Arkansas, United States. It is located southwest of Tontitown on Harmon Road.

References

Unincorporated communities in Washington County, Arkansas
Unincorporated communities in Arkansas